The 1951–52 season was Fussball Club Basel 1893's 58th season in their existence. It was their sixth season in Nationalliga A the top flight of Swiss football following their promotion from the Nationalliga B in the season 1945–46. Basel played their home games in the Landhof, in the Quarter Kleinbasel. Jules Düblin was the club's chairman for the sixth successive season.

Overview 
Ernst Hufschmid, who had functioned as player-coach the previous four seasons, continued as team manager this season. Basel played a total of 42 games in this season. Of these 26 games were in the domestic league, five games were in the Swiss Cup and eleven were test games. The test games resulted with four victories, two were drawn and five ended with defeats. In total, including the test games and the cup competition, they won 22 games, drew five and lost 15 times. In the 42 games they scored 123 and conceded 87 goals.
 
The newly built stadium Landhof was opened on the weekend of 18 and 19 August 1951. There were larger spectator stands, new meeting rooms, changing rooms and a brand new restaurant. The buildings had cost 700,000 Swiss Francs and had taken two years to complete, during this time the team had to play all their games at the Stadion Schützenmatte. The pitch had been newly laid out and its opening was accompanied by a two-day international football tournament, competed by Austrian team First Vienna, French team Sochaux-Montbéliard and Swiss teams Grasshopper Club Zürich. On both days there were over six thousand people celebrating the big party, even though their team lost 2–3 against Vienna and even 1–7 against Sochaux. It was a big hope that these new conditions would also change the fortunes of the club to the better, because nearly 60 years had passed since the club's foundation without a championship. The Basel fans were becoming frustrated, because 36 of the first 52 championships had gone to the cities of Zürich, Geneva or Bern. Even small towns such as Aarau, Neuchâtel, La Chaux-de-Fonds, Lugano, Bellinzona, Biel/Bienne, Winterthur and St. Gallen had been able to celebrate a championship. The championship had still had never been won by a team from Basel.

As in the previous seasons, there were fourteen teams contesting in the 1951–52 Nationalliga A and the bottom two teams in the league table were to be relegated. Basel played a good start to the season. They won the first six games straight off. But they lost four of the next five games and slipped in the league table. However, winning the last three games before and the first three games after the winter break, they were again in contention for the league championship. Suddenly, towards the end of the season, they lost five games in a row and lost contact to the table top. At the end of the season Basel finished in fourth position, seven points behind the new champions Grasshopper Club. The hopeful fans were again frustrated by this fact. The team Basel had won 14 games, drew three games and were defeated nine times. The team scored 68 goals and conceded 47 as they obtained their 31 points. Josef "Seppe" Hügi was team's and the league's best goal scorer with 24 league goals. Walter Bannwart was the team's second-best goal getter with 10 goals. Paul Stöcklin scored nine times, René Bader and Hans Hügi both scored seven times.

Basel started in the 3rd principal round of the Swiss Cup on 4 November 1951 with a home game against lower tier Wettingen and won 7–0. In the next round against Nationalliga A team Locarno they won 3–2 and again in the following round against Nationalliga A team Chiasso by three goals to one. In the quarter finals Basel beat Servette and faced Grasshopper Club in the semi-final. The Grasshoppers won this game in the Landhof and progressed to the final, in which they beat Lugano and thus won the double.

Players 
The following is the list of the Basel first team squad during the season 1950–51. The list includes players that were in the squad on the day that the Nationalliga A season started on 3 September 1950 but subsequently left the club after that date.

 
 
 

 
 

 

Players who left the squad

Results

Legend

Friendly matches

Pre-season

Winter break and mid-season

Nationalliga A

League matches

League standings

Swiss Cup

See also
 History of FC Basel
 List of FC Basel players
 List of FC Basel seasons

References

Sources 
 Die ersten 125 Jahre. Publisher: Josef Zindel im Friedrich Reinhardt Verlag, Basel. 
 The FCB team 1951–52 at fcb-archiv.ch
 Switzerland 1951–52 by Erik Garin at Rec.Sport.Soccer Statistics Foundation

External links
 FC Basel official site

FC Basel seasons
Basel